Mohawk is an unincorporated community in Lane County, Oregon, United States, on the Mohawk River, about seven miles upstream from Springfield.

When a post office was established at this locale in 1862, it was named "Mohawk" after the river. The post office operated intermittently, and after being converted to a rural station in 1958, it was finally terminated in 1961. When the Southern Pacific Railroad established a station on the Marcola line there, it was named "Donna". Historically there was also a nearby locale known as "Mohawk Post".

References

External links
Historic image of covered railroad bridge near Mohawk from Salem Public Library
Historic images of Mohawk from the University of Oregon Library collections

Unincorporated communities in Lane County, Oregon
1862 establishments in Oregon
Populated places established in 1862
Unincorporated communities in Oregon